The 1913 Christian Brothers football team represented the Christian Brothers College High School during the 1913 college football season.  The Brothers compiled a 6–2–1 record, and outscored their opponents 251 to 85.

Schedule

References

Christian Brothers
Christian Brothers football team